The Shelter, also known as Club Shelter, was a New York City house music and techno nightclub in the 1990s/2000s. The club was at multiple locations including 6 Hubert Street, 157 Hudson Street, 150 Varick Street in Manhattan depending on the date. The Shelter was established by resident DJs Timmy Regisford, Merlin Bobb, and Freddy Sanon. The club is closely associated with record label 157 Shelter Records.

History
In 1991, The Shelter opened its doors following the closing of Paradise Garage.  The Shelter became a sanctuary for people to express themselves in which race and sexual orientation did not matter. 

The Shelter's most active promoters and DJs were collectively known as "N.A.S.A." (Nocturnal Audio + Sensory Awakening), who hosted parties at the club on Friday night. Promotional flyers claimed The Shelter was "New York City's only Non-prejudicial Progressive Underground Dance Club." The dance floor had an incredibly loud 37,000 watt sound system designed by Dave Soto, a New York-based audio specialist, in collaboration with Garage-era DJ legend Timmy Regisford. The speaker cabinets were larger than the dancers.

N.A.S.A. was a non-alcoholic, after-hours dance party starting on Friday night and running into Saturday morning at The Shelter located in TriBeCa. N.A.S.A. events typically lasted until 8AM or 9AM. The admission charge of $9 before midnight or $14 after included ice water, snacks and breakfast.

New location
In 2004, real estate developer Peter Moore purchased the building for $18 million, and the property is now home to upscale residential lofts. Moore had previously forced the closing of two other nightclubs, including Wetlands at 161 Hudson, when he bought their buildings for restoration. On December 18, 2011, Club Shelter officially reopened at its new location at 37 Vandam Street.

DJs
Resident and Guest DJs include:
 Moby
 Dmitry (Deee-Lite)
 Keoki (Disco 2000)
 Michele Sainte
 Scotto (Scott Osman)
 Jason Jinx
 On-E
 DB (originally from London)
 Guy DMC
 Jacyln Christie
 Dante
 Soul Slinger
 Timmy Regisford
 Mr. Kleen
 Odi
 Heather Heart
 Adam X
 Orbital
 Vapor Space
 Frankie Bones
 Troy Davis

See also

The Limelight
Webster Hall
Twilo (formerly The Sound Factory; closed in 2001)
Roxy NYC
Paradise Garage

References

 Time (magazine)
 "Another Bleep World" - Village Voice, Feb. 16, 1993

External links
 Official website

Nightclubs in Manhattan